Tairora may refer to:
Tairora people
Tairora language